St. Mary’s Cathedral is a Catholic cathedral church located in Amarillo, Texas, United States.  It has been the seat of the Diocese of Amarillo since 2011.

History
The property that is now St. Mary’s Cathedral was originally St. Mary’s Academy founded by the Sisters of Charity of the Incarnate Word from San Antonio.  Sacred Heart Cathedral bought the property in 1944.  Three years later a chapel from an Air Force base was moved to the school property and became a chapel of convenience for the cathedral parish.  St. Mary’s Parish was started at the Academy property in 1959.  A new church was built for the parish in 1981 and it was destroyed in a fire on February 26, 2007.

The first to raise the possibility of St. Mary’s becoming a cathedral was Bishop John Yanta.  Because he was nearing retirement no action was taken.  His successor, Bishop Patrick Zurek, made a request of the Holy See to change the cathedral from St. Laurence Cathedral.  The present church was dedicated on September 11, 2010 and it was proclaimed as the third cathedral of the Amarillo Diocese on March 25, 2011.

Architecture
When Sacred Heart Cathedral downtown was being torn down Msgr. Francis Smyer, who was pastor of St. Mary’s from 1970-2001, collected articles from the old church.  Most of these articles have been incorporated into the new St. Mary’s Cathedral.   The stained glass windows by Conrad Schmidt Studios of Milwaukee are from the old cathedral, as is the altar stone, which is actually the three altar stones from Sacred Heart’s three altars.  Documentation shows that the relics are from St. Thomas Aquinas, St. John Vianney and St. Pius X.  Two carved wood angels in the Adoration Chapel are from Sacred Heart’s side altars, and the altar in the daily Mass chapel is one of the side altars.  The reliquary behind the Tabernacle contains 25 relics of beatified and canonized saints.  Original works of art include the tapestries from Taos, New Mexico and a baptismal pool made of copper by an artist from South Texas.  The pipe organ has 1,200 pipes and trumpets valued at $900,000.  On the exterior of the cathedral is a bas relief in the brick of Virgin Mary with the Christ Child.  It was created by a Nebraska artist.

See also
List of Catholic cathedrals in the United States
List of cathedrals in the United States

References

External links
Cathedral Website
Diocese of Amarillo Website

Christian organizations established in 1959
Roman Catholic churches completed in 2010
Buildings and structures in Amarillo, Texas
Modernist architecture in Texas
Mary Amarillo
Tourist attractions in Amarillo, Texas
21st-century Roman Catholic church buildings in the United States